Craig James (born April 29, 1996) is an American football cornerback for the New York Jets of the National Football League (NFL). He played college football at Southern Illinois.

Early life and high school
James was born and grew up in Edwardsville, Illinois and attended Edwardsville High School, where he played football and ran track.

College career
James played his first two seasons at the University of Minnesota, serving as a reserve corner and the team's primary punt returner until breaking his leg during his sophomore season. James transferred to Southern Illinois for his final two seasons. As a junior, James recorded 30 tackles and led the Salukis with three interceptions and nine passes broken up and was named to the Missouri Valley Football Conference All-Newcomer team.

Professional career

Minnesota Vikings
James was signed by the Minnesota Vikings as an undrafted free agent on April 30, 2018. He was cut by the Vikings at the end of the preseason. James was re-signed to the Vikings' practice squad on October 16, 2018. James was promoted to the Vikings' active roster on November 27, 2018. James made his NFL debut on December 2, 2018 against the New England Patriots. James played three games during his rookie season, appearing exclusively on special teams.

James was waived during final roster cuts on August 31, 2019.

Philadelphia Eagles
James was signed to the Philadelphia Eagles practice squad on September 2, 2019. He was promoted to the team's active roster on September 11, 2019. He was waived on September 17, and re-signed to the team's practice squad the next day. He was promoted to the active roster again on September 24 after an injury to Ronald Darby. In the following game against the Green Bay Packers and in the third defensive snap of his career, James deflected a pass at the Eagles three-yard line that was then intercepted by linebacker Nigel Bradham with 28 seconds left to preserve a 34-27 Eagles win. James made his first career start the next week on October 6, 2019 against the New York Jets, making three tackles.

On September 4, 2020, James signed a one-year contract extension with the Eagles through the 2021 season. He was placed on injured reserve on September 15, 2020. He was designated to return from injured reserve on October 7, and began practicing with the team again. He was activated on October 10. He was placed back on injured reserve on November 16 with a shoulder injury.

On August 31, 2021, James was waived by the Eagles and re-signed to the practice squad the next day. He was placed on the COVID list on January 1, 2022 and activated three days later, missing just one game. He signed a reserve/future contract with the Eagles on January 18, 2022. He was released July 18, 2022.

New York Jets
On July 21, 2022, James signed with the New York Jets, but was released five days later. He was signed to the practice squad on September 1, 2022. He signed a reserve/future contract on January 9, 2023.

References

External links
Minnesota Golden Gophers bio
Southern Illinois Salukis bio
Philadelphia Eagles bio

1996 births
Living people
American football cornerbacks
Minnesota Golden Gophers football players
Minnesota Vikings players
New York Jets players
People from Edwardsville, Illinois
Philadelphia Eagles players
Players of American football from Illinois
Southern Illinois Salukis football players
Sportspeople from Greater St. Louis